Daepyeong-dong is neighborhood of Sejong City, South Korea.

References 

Neighbourhoods in Sejong City